Jung Nam-suk is a South Korean taekwondo practitioner. 

She won a gold medal in bantamweight at the 1989 World Taekwondo Championships in Seoul, by defeating Chen Yi-an in the semifinal, and Diane Murray in the final.

References

External links

Year of birth missing (living people)
Living people
South Korean female taekwondo practitioners
World Taekwondo Championships medalists
20th-century South Korean women